Barrett Rich is a Republican former member of the Tennessee House of Representatives for the 94th District, encompassing Fayette, Hardeman and Tipton.

Biography
Barrett Rich was born in Somerville, Tennessee on June 14, 1977. He received a B.S. in Management from Bethel College, and graduated from the Tennessee Law Enforcement Training Academy and the Tennessee Highway Patrol Trooper School. He started his career as a Tennessee State Trooper. He now works as an insurance agent.

He is a member of the Somerville Rotary, the Tennessee Right to Life, the Fraternal Order of Police, and the Farm Bureau. He is also involved with the Chambers of Commerce in Fayette, Oakland and South Tipton.

He is a Methodist and a Freemason. He supports the death penalty

References

1977 births
Living people
Republican Party members of the Tennessee House of Representatives
People from Somerville, Tennessee